Susan M. Austin is an American politician from Maine.

Austin earned an A.A. from Bliss College in Lewiston, Maine. She and her husband have four children.

A Republican, Austin has represented the town of Gray, in the Maine House of Representatives since 2014. She previously held the same seat from 2002 to 2010. In 2010, she was unable to seek re-election in 2010 due to term-limits. She has also served on the Gray Town Council as well as on the MSAD 15 School Board.

Austin ran again for the District 109 seat in 2012 but lost by 35 votes to incumbent Democrat Anne Graham. She ran once more in 2014 and won the seat, which opened when Anne Graham did not seek re-election.

References

Year of birth missing (living people)
Living people
People from Gray, Maine
Maine city council members
School board members in Maine
Republican Party members of the Maine House of Representatives
Women state legislators in Maine
Bliss College alumni
Women city councillors in Maine
21st-century American politicians
21st-century American women politicians